Rajani Kanta Barman (born 2 February 1979) is a retired Bangladeshi international footballer who played as a defender for  Muktijoddha Sangsad KS. He is former Bangladesh national football team player and has a total of 70 appearances during his 13 yearlong international career. He is seen as one of the finest  centre backs Bangladesh has produced.

Club career
Rajani started his football career with Agrani Bank Ltd. SC in 1994 and later joined Muktijoddha Sangsad KS in 1999. He spent most of his career with Muktijoddha Sangsad KS, with a total of 12 years with the club, during which he had a 2-year spell with Dhaka Abahani before moving to Mohammedan permanently. He retired during the 2013-2014 season while playing for Sheikh Russel KC

International career
On 4 April 1999, Barman made his debut for the national team during a goalless draw against India in the 1999 SAFF Cup group stages. He was the captain of 2003 SAFF Cup winning Bangladesh team. His last appearance for the national side came during a victory against Sri Lanka in the 2009 SAFF Championship. After being a regular member for the Bangladesh team for 10 years, he officially announced his retirement from international football in 2011. His jersey number in the national team was usually number 4.

Honours
Mohammedan Sporting Club
 Bangladesh Super Cup: 2013
Muktijoddha Sangsad KS
 National Football Championship: 2003
 Bangladesh Federation Cup: 2001, 2003

Bangladesh
 SAFF Gold Cup: 2003

References

Living people
1976 births
Bangladeshi footballers
Bangladesh international footballers
Bangladeshi Hindus
Footballers at the 2002 Asian Games
Footballers at the 2006 Asian Games
Association football defenders
Asian Games competitors for Bangladesh
Bangladesh Football Premier League players
Muktijoddha Sangsad KC players
Abahani Limited (Dhaka) players
Sheikh Russel KC players
Mohammedan SC (Dhaka) players